Theretra timorensis is a moth of the  family Sphingidae. It is known from Timor in Indonesia.

References

Theretra
Moths described in 2010